Boeger Peak is a snow-covered peak,  high, situated  west of Richmond Peak on the Toney Mountain massif, Marie Byrd Land. It was mapped by the United States Geological Survey from surveys and from U.S. Navy air photos, 1959–66, and named by the Advisory Committee on Antarctic Names for Alvin C. Boeger, Chief Aerographer's Mate, U.S. Navy. As a member of the U.S. Naval Ice Reconnaissance Unit, Boeger made numerous ice reconnaissance flights between New Zealand and Antarctica from October to December 1972 which contributed to ship operations and routing.

References 

Mountains of Marie Byrd Land